Robert William Wells (November 29, 1795 – September 22, 1864) was an American lawyer and jurist who served as judge of the United States District Court for the Western District of Missouri (1857–1864) and the United States District Court for the District of Missouri (1836–1857). He previously served as the 3rd attorney general of Missouri from 1826 to 1836. Wells is credited with designing the Missouri State Seal.

Early life and career
Born in Winchester, Virginia, Robert William Wells read law to enter the bar in 1820. He was in private practice in St. Charles, Missouri from 1820 to 1821, and was a circuit attorney of the St. Charles Circuit from 1821 to 1822. In 1822, he designed the Missouri State Seal. He was a member of the Missouri House of Representatives from 1823 to 1826. He was the attorney general of Missouri from 1826 to 1836.

Federal judicial service
Wells was nominated by President Andrew Jackson on June 16, 1836, to a seat on the United States District Court for the District of Missouri vacated by Judge James H. Peck. He was confirmed by the United States Senate on June 27, 1836, and received his commission the same day. Wells was reassigned by operation of law to the United States District Court for the Western District of Missouri on March 3, 1857, to a new seat authorized by 11 Stat. 197. His service terminated on September 22, 1864, due to his death in Bowling Green, Kentucky.

See also
 Great Seal of Missouri
 List of attorneys general of Missouri
 List of federal judges appointed by Andrew Jackson

References

External links

 
 
 Robert W. Wells Papers, 1826-1863 at The State Historical Society of Missouri

1795 births
1864 deaths
19th-century American judges
Burials in Missouri
Coats of arms designers
Judges of the United States District Court for the District of Missouri
Judges of the United States District Court for the Western District of Missouri
Members of the Missouri House of Representatives
Missouri Attorneys General
Politicians from Winchester, Virginia
United States federal judges admitted to the practice of law by reading law
United States federal judges appointed by Andrew Jackson